For Ann (rising) is a piece of electronic music composed by American composer and music theorist James Tenney in 1969. The piece incorporates the Shepard tone concept, named after Tenney's colleague at Bell Labs, psychologist Roger Shepard. The technique which the piece uses is more properly described as a continuous Risset scale, or a Shepard-Risset glissando .

It consists of a repeating sequence of sine waves arranged in a glissando between twelve and fifteen rising at any time and fading in and out, entering a minor sixth below their predecessors. The concept of the piece derived from Tenney's speculations on auditory illusions in his 1961 master's thesis Meta (+) Hodos, an early application of gestalt theory and cognitive science to music.

Variations
Imagining an inverted version of For Ann (rising), American composer Philip Corner once remarked that the piece "must be optimistic! (Imagine the depressing effectiveness of it—he could never be so cruel—downward)..." .

Tenney suggested in later years that the piece could be "regenerated" with the distance between successive voices, the minor sixth (1.6 in just intonation, 1.587 in equal temperament), being tuned to golden ratio phi (1.618). He noted that this would aurally achieve a more illusory effect, because then all first-order difference tones between adjacent voices would be present in lower voices .

See also
Pitch circularity

Sources

External links
 James Tenney: Selected Works 1961–1969 at Artifact Records

Process music pieces
1969 compositions